Accessories – Rarities and B-Sides is a compilation album by Dutch alternative rock band The Gathering. The album was released on 22 August 2005 by Century Media. The album features B-sides and demos the group released from 1995 to 2000 while with Century Media. The first disc is compiled from B-Sides taken from The Gathering's out-of-print single releases, whilst the second disc is composed of demo recordings from the albums Nighttime Birds and How to measure a planet?. Included are such rarities as their cover versions of Talk Talk, Dead Can Dance and Slowdive.

Track listing

Personnel
 Anneke van Giersbergen – lead vocals/guitars
 René Rutten – guitars/flute
 Jelmer Wiersma – guitars
 Frank Boeijen – keyboards
 Hugo Prinsen Geerligs – bass
 Hans Rutten – drums

References

2005 compilation albums
Century Media Records albums
The Gathering (band) albums